The ASCB Early Career Life Scientist Award is awarded by the American Society for Cell Biology to an outstanding scientist who earned his doctorate no more than 12 years earlier and who has served as an independent investigator for no more than seven years. The winner speaks at the ASCB Annual Meeting and receives a monetary prize.

Awardees
Source: American Society for Cell Biology
2020 James Olzmann
2019 Cignall Kadoch
2018 Sergiu Pasca
2017 Meng Wang
2016 Bo Huang;Valentina Greco
2015 Vladimir Denic
2014 Manuel Thery
2013 Douglas B. Weibel
2012 Iain Cheeseman
2012 Gia Voeltz
2011 Maxence V. Nachury
2010 Anna Kashina 
2009 Martin W. Hetzer
2008 Arshad B. Desai 
2007 Abby Dernburg
2006 Karsten Weis
2005 Eva Nogales
2004 No award this year
2003 Frank Gertler
2002 Kathleen Collins and Benjamin Cravatt
2001 Daphne Preuss
2000 Erin O'Shea
1999 Raymond Deshaies

See also

 List of biology awards

References

American Society for Cell Biology
Biology awards
Early career awards
American awards
Awards established in 1999
1999 establishments in the United States